Russian Roulette is the third studio album by American hip hop producer and recording artist The Alchemist, the album was released on July 17, 2012. The project is constructed from samples of Soviet music (hence the title), making it a concept album. Featured artists on the project consists of acts such as Evidence, Fashawn, Roc Marciano, Action Bronson, Guilty Simpson, Danny Brown, Schoolboy Q, Big Twins.

The album is not focused on rap and lyrics, rather it's more of an artistic rendition of tracks that are collages of samples, excerpts and elements from Soviet songs, among other sources (like a Memorex commercial). Fifteen of the thirty tracks do contain rapped lyrics on them.

In the album's booklet, there is different artwork for each song on the album.

Singles
 "Flight Confirmation" featuring Danny Brown and Schoolboy Q
 "Don Seymour's Theme" featuring MidaZ

Track listing 
All tracks produced by the Alchemist.

Chart history

References

2012 mixtape albums
The Alchemist (musician) albums
Albums produced by the Alchemist (musician)
Decon albums